Jamame (formerly Villaggio Regina Margherita), also spelled Giamame, is a town in the southern Lower Juba (Jubbada Hoose) region of Somalia. There are many farms located near Jamame. The equator passes over the town.

Overview
Jamame is situated between the Somali Sea in the east, the agricultural land along the Jubba River in the west, and the port city of Kismayo in the south. It is the center of the Jamame District.

Since 2014, the Al-Shabaab terror group has controlled Jamaame. In June 2018, American Special Forces and Al-Shabaab fighters engaged in a firefight near Jamame, which killed one American soldier.

Demographics
In 2005, Jamame had a population of around 235,000 inhabitants according to the UNDP.

The Town is primarily inhabited and also domimated by Bimal sub-clan of Dir  well known for leading a resistance against the Europian invaders in Southern Somalia.

References

Populated places in Lower Juba